Coryphopterus is a genus of gobies primarily found in the western Atlantic Ocean, although some species are found in the Indian and/or Pacific oceans.

Species
There are currently 14 recognized species in this genus:
 Coryphopterus alloides J. E. Böhlke & C. R. Robins, 1960 (Barfin goby)
 Coryphopterus curasub C. C. Baldwin & D. R. Robertson, 2015 (Yellow-spotted sand goby)  
 Coryphopterus dicrus J. E. Böhlke & C. R. Robins, 1960 (Colon goby)
 Coryphopterus eidolon J. E. Böhlke & C. R. Robins, 1960 (Pallid goby)
 Coryphopterus glaucofraenum T. N. Gill, 1863 (Bridled goby)
 Coryphopterus hyalinus J. E. Böhlke & C. R. Robins, 1962 (Glass goby)
 Coryphopterus kuna Victor, 2007
 Coryphopterus lipernes J. E. Böhlke & C. R. Robins, 1962 (Peppermint goby)
 Coryphopterus personatus (D. S. Jordan & J. C. Thompson, 1905) (Masked goby)
 Coryphopterus punctipectophorus V. G. Springer, 1960 (Spotted goby)
 Coryphopterus thrix J. E. Böhlke & C. R. Robins, 1960 (Bartail goby)
 Coryphopterus tortugae (D. S. Jordan, 1904) (Patch-reef goby)
 Coryphopterus urospilus Ginsburg, 1938 (Redlight goby)
 Coryphopterus venezuelae Cervigón, 1966

References

Gobiidae
Taxa named by Theodore Gill
Marine fish genera